The discography of English electronic music band Depeche Mode consists of 14 studio albums, seven live albums, 10 compilation albums, 16 box sets and 55 singles. The band's music has been released on several labels, including Some Bizzare, Mute Records, Sire Records, Reprise Records, and Columbia Records. Formed in Basildon, Essex, England in 1980, the group's original line-up was Dave Gahan (lead vocals), Martin Gore (keyboards, guitar, vocals, chief songwriter after 1981), Andy Fletcher (keyboards, bass guitar) and Vince Clarke (keyboards, chief songwriter 1980–81). Vince Clarke left the band after the release of their 1981 debut album Speak & Spell and was replaced by Alan Wilder (production, keyboards, drums), who was a band member from 1982 to 1995. Following Wilder's departure, Gahan, Gore, and Fletcher continued as a trio until Fletcher's death in 2022.

Since their debut in 1981, Depeche Mode have had 54 songs in the UK Singles Chart, as well as one US, and two UK number one albums (Songs of Faith and Devotion and Ultra). All studio albums have reached Top 10 in the UK. Also they had 7 number one albums in the German Album Charts from 1993 to 2017. According to their record company, Depeche Mode have sold in excess of 100 million records worldwide. The group's concert video Devotional was nominated for "Best Long Form Music Video" at the 37th Grammy Awards in 1995. "Suffer Well", the third single off the album Playing the Angel, was nominated in the category for "Best Dance Recording" at the 49th Grammy Awards in 2007. On 19 December 2006, Depeche Mode's back catalogue was released on the iTunes Store as The Complete Depeche Mode. On 3 December 2009, Sounds of the Universe was nominated for a Grammy Award for Best Alternative Album. They received a second nomination for the video "Wrong": for Best Short Form Music Video at the 52nd Grammy Awards.

Albums

Studio albums

Live albums

Live album series

Compilation albums

Video albums

Singles

1980s

1990s

2000s

2010s

2020s

Other charted songs

Chronology
Starting with their sixth single ("Leave in Silence"), most official European Depeche Mode single releases are chronologically ordered with a sequential number prefixed by the word "BONG". For example, the fifth Depeche Mode single to follow this pattern, "People Are People", is identified with the code "BONG5", printed on the single's cover, spine and on the record or CD itself. The "BONG" designation is preceded with numbers or letters that indicate the format of the release, such as "7" for a 7" single, "CD" for a CD-single, or "i" for an iTunes-only release. Additional letters such as "L" or "XL" denote a limited edition release. Promotional-only releases include a "P" prefix. For example, "PL12BONG37" indicates the limited, promotional-only 12" single release of "Suffer Well". This scheme was modified for one release: "Little 15" was labeled as "12 LITTLE 15" instead of being given a "BONG" designation. Some singles also had unique prefixes, such as the gatefold 7" single of "Personal Jesus", which was designated GBONG17.

The first five Depeche Mode singles did not use "BONG" and instead followed their label's "MUTE" single numbering scheme. Depeche Mode used the BONG numbering scheme until their departure from Mute Records after 2011.

Non-UK single releases (such as the US-only "Strangelove '88"), which were not given BONG designations, are omitted from the following list.

Speak & Spell era (1981)
 MUTE 13: "Dreaming of Me" (1981)
 MUTE 14: "New Life" (1981)
 MUTE 16: "Just Can't Get Enough" (1981)

A Broken Frame era (1982)
 MUTE 18: "See You" (1982)
 MUTE 22: "The Meaning of Love" (1982)
 BONG 1: "Leave in Silence" (1982)

Construction Time Again era (1983)
 BONG 2: "Get the Balance Right!" (1983)
 BONG 3: "Everything Counts" (1983)
 BONG 4: "Love, In Itself" (1983)

Some Great Reward era (1984)
 BONG 5: "People Are People" (1984)
 BONG 6: "Master and Servant" (1984)
 BONG 7: "Blasphemous Rumours / Somebody" (1984)

The Singles 81→85 era (1985)
 BONG 8: "Shake the Disease" (1985)
 BONG 9: "It's Called a Heart" (1985)

Black Celebration era (1986)
 BONG 10: "Stripped" (1986)
 BONG 11: "A Question of Lust" (1986)
 BONG 12: "A Question of Time" (1986)

Music for the Masses era (1987–1989)
 BONG 13: "Strangelove" (1987)
 BONG 14: "Never Let Me Down Again" (1987)
 BONG 15: "Behind The Wheel" (1987)
 LITTLE 15: "Little 15" (1988)
 BONG 16: "Everything Counts (Live)" (1989)

Violator era (1989–1990)
 BONG 17: "Personal Jesus" (1989)
 BONG 18: "Enjoy the Silence" (1990)
 BONG 19: "Policy of Truth" (1990)
 BONG 20: "World in My Eyes" (1990)

Songs of Faith and Devotion era (1993–1994)
 BONG 21: "I Feel You" (1993)
 BONG 22: "Walking in My Shoes" (1993)
 BONG 23: "Condemnation" (1993)
 BONG 24: "In Your Room" (1994)

Ultra era (1997)
 BONG 25: "Barrel of a Gun" (1997)
 BONG 26: "It's No Good" (1997)
 BONG 27: "Home" (1997)
 BONG 28: "Useless" (1997)

The Singles 86>98 era (1998)
 BONG 29: "Only When I Lose Myself" (1998)

Exciter era (2001–2002)
 BONG 30: "Dream On" (2001)
 BONG 31: "I Feel Loved" (2001)
 BONG 32: "Freelove" (2001)
 BONG 33: "Goodnight Lovers" (2002)

Remixes 81–04 era (2004)
 BONG 34: "Enjoy the Silence 04" (2004)

Playing the Angel era (2005–2006)
 BONG 35: "Precious" (2005)
 BONG 36: "A Pain That I'm Used To" (2005)
 BONG 37: "Suffer Well" (2006)
 BONG 38: "John the Revelator" / "Lilian" (2006)

The Best of Depeche Mode Vol 1 era (2006)
 BONG 39: "Martyr" (2006)

Sounds of the Universe era (2009)
 BONG 40: "Wrong" (2009)
 BONG 41: "Peace" (2009)
 BONG 42: "Hole to Feed" / "Fragile Tension" (2009)

Remixes 2: 81–11 era (2011)
 BONG 43: "Personal Jesus 2011" (2011)

BONG releases with no "L" editions: BONG 1, BONG 7, BONG 9 (and LITTLE 15).
Five "XL" editions: BONG 18, BONG 24, BONG 29, BONG 34 and BONG 37.
Other letters: 7BONG7E, D12BONG9, GBONG17.

Box sets

Music videos

Other appearances

See also
 Depeche Mode videography

Notes

References

External links
 
 
 
 

Discography
Discographies of British artists
Electronic music discographies
Pop music group discographies
New wave discographies